Saturn is a planet in the Solar System.

Saturn also commonly refers to:
 Saturn (mythology), an Ancient Roman god
 Sega Saturn, a video game console
 Saturn Awards, an award presented by the Academy of Science Fiction, Fantasy and Horror Films
 Saturn (rocket family)

Saturn may also refer to:

Transportation
 Saturn Corporation, a brand of cars
 Saturn Airways, an American air carrier
 Lockheed Saturn, a civil airliner transport first flown in 1946
 NPO Saturn, a Russian jet engine manufacturer
 Saturn AL-31, a family of military turbofan engines developed by NPO Saturn
 MV Saturn, a 1977 Scottish ferry
 RFA Stromness (A344) or USNS Saturn, a British Royal Navy fleet stores ship sold to the United States Military Sealift Command

Literature
 Saturn (magazine), a science fiction magazine
 Saturn, a novel in Ben Bova's Grand Tour series
 Saturn, a novel by Edwin Roxburgh

Places
 Saturn, Romania, a resort in Romania
 Saturn, Indiana, an unincorporated community in Whitley County, Indiana, United States

Computing and electronics
 Saturn (software), traffic assignment software
 Saturn (retailer), a German electronics store
 SATURN Development Group, a microchip industry forum
 HP Saturn, the CPU in certain Hewlett-Packard programmable calculators

Music
 Saturn (band), a Pakistani rock band
 Saturn (album), a 2018 album by Nao
 "Saturn" (song), a 2017 collaboration between Sufjan Stevens, Bryce Dessner, Nico Muhly and James McAlister
 "Saturn", a single by Ganymed 
 "Saturn", a 1997 song by Skillet from Skillet
 "Saturn", a song by Stevie Wonder from Songs in the Key of Life
 "Saturn", a song by Sleeping at Last from Space 2
 "Saturn", a song by Xiu Xiu from La Forêt

Fictional characters
 Commander Saturn, in the video games Pokémon Diamond, Pearl, and Platinum
 Mr. Saturn, a fictional alien species in the video game EarthBound
 Sailor Saturn or Hotaru Tomoe, a Sailor Moon character

Other uses
 Saturn (alligator) (1936-2020), an American alligator at the Moscow Zoo, Russia
 Saturn (astrology), a symbolic planet and element in astrology and alchemy
 Saturn (detachment), a Russian Ministry of Justice special forces unit
 Saturn (Rubens), a 1636 painting by Peter Paul Rubens
 Second-generation Anti-jam Tactical UHF Radio for NATO, a successor product of HAVE QUICK
 Saturn FC, an American soccer club
 FC Saturn Ramenskoye, a Russian football club
 Zeuxidia amethystus or common Saturn, a species of butterfly
 Zeuxidia aurelius or giant Saturn, a species of butterfly
 Perry Saturn, ring name of American professional wrestler Perry Arthur Satullo (born 1966)
 A Bayer CropScience brand name for benthiocarb

See also
 Operation Little Saturn, a Soviet offensive during World War II
 Saturn Girl, a comic book superhero
 Saturn Queen, a comic book supervillain
 Salvation Army Team Emergency Radio Network (SATERN)
 Saturna (disambiguation)
 Saturnalia